Edith Grace White (May 16, 1890 – December 1, 1975) was an American zoologist known for her studies of elasmobranchs (sharks and rays). She was a professor of biology at Wilson College, and was a research associate of the American Museum of Natural History in New York City.

Education and career
White was born in Boston, Massachusetts on May 16, 1890.  She earned a bachelor's degree at Mount Holyoke College.  She went on to Columbia University for her graduate education, receiving an AM in 1913, and a PhD in 1918.  Her thesis was titled The origin of the electric organs in Astroscopus guttatus.

After a short time in positions at Heidelberg College and Shorter College, White moved to Wilson College in 1923, where she worked as a professor until 1958.  She also continued to do research at the American Museum of Natural History, where she had a position as research associate from the mid-1930s until 1947.

White published widely-used textbooks on genetics and on general biology.

White died on December 1, 1975 in a nursing home near Chambersburg, Pennsylvania.

Books
  1st ed. (1933) and 2nd ed. (1937) with same publisher.
  Revised edition of Principles of Genetics, published by C.V. Mosby.

References

External links 
 Books by White available online, from University of Pennsylvania Libraries

1890 births
1975 deaths
Wilson College (Pennsylvania) faculty
Mount Holyoke College alumni
Columbia University alumni
American ichthyologists
Women ichthyologists
20th-century American women scientists
Scientists from Boston
20th-century American zoologists